Thulisile Phongolo (also Thuli P; born 22 January 1994) is an actress and disc jockey in South African media.

Career
By September 2017, Phongolo was an amateur disc jockey, a profession she maintained through at least November 2019.

Acting
Phongolo began her acting career playing Zama on the South African Broadcasting Corporation's (SABC) TV series Tshisa.  While a prefect at her high school, Phongolo played Namhla Diale on the soap opera Generations: The Legacy.  After leaving that show in 2018, Phongolo acted in SABC's TV series Makoti and Mzansi Magic's The Republic.  In November 2021, she was performing in The Wife: Showmax's telenovela adaptation of Dudu Busani-Dube's Hlomu: The Wife.  That same month, she was announced to be appearing in the film, I Am Sofia.

References

External links
 

1994 births
living people
soap opera actresses
telenovela actresses
women DJs